Kallang Road is a major arterial road in Kallang, Singapore. It links Sims Avenue and Geylang Road at Sir Arthur's Bridge in the east to Victoria Street at Victoria Bridge in the west.

Landmarks along Kallang Road include the Kallang Riverside Park, the ICA Building, Lavender MRT station and the former Kallang Gasworks.

Roads in Singapore
Kallang